Frankfort Township may refer to:
 Frankfort Township, Franklin County, Illinois
 Frankfort Township, Will County, Illinois
 Frankfort Township, Knox County, Nebraska

Township name disambiguation pages